Samson Kuagu-ipa Chanba (18 June 1886 – 1937) was a pioneering writer and statesman from Abkhazia killed in Joseph Stalin's Great Purge.

Chanba was born on 18 June 1886 in the village of Atara. He initially became a teacher. In 1919 he published the poem Daughter of the Mountains, and in 1920 the play Amkhadzyr, the first play written in the Abkhaz language.

After the October Revolution, Chanba became active in politics. In 1921 Chanba joined the Communist Party and he became co-editor (with M. Khashba) of the newspaper Red Abkhazia and the People's Commissar for Education of the SSR Abkhazia. In 1925 Chanba became the Chairman of the Central Executive Committee of the SSR Abkhazia, and from 1930 to 1932 he returned to his position of People's Commissar for Education. From 1932 until 1937 Chanba was a fellow at the Abkhazian Institute for Language, Literature and History and from 1935 until 1937 Chairman of the Writers' Union of Abkhazia.

In 1937 Chanba was arrested and subsequently shot in Stalin's Great Purge.

References

1886 births
1937 deaths
Abkhazian writers
Abkhazian poets
Abkhazian politicians
Great Purge victims
Abkhazian murder victims
Communist Party of the Soviet Union members
Abkhazian dramatists and playwrights
Executed Abkhaz people
20th-century poets
20th-century dramatists and playwrights